The Paper Kites are an Australian indie rock/folk rock band from Melbourne, Victoria. The band was formed in 2009 by lead vocalist/guitarist Sam Bentley and keyboardist/guitarist Christina Lacy. To date, the band has released five studio albums and four EPs. Their latest studio album, Roses, was released on 12 March 2021.

History
Before the formation of the Paper Kites, the current five members were close friends. In high school, Bentley and Lacy began writing and playing music together, and continued to do so for a few years after high school. They gained some attention by playing in their home town of Melbourne. In 2010, Bentley and Lacy expanded the line adding Sam Rasmussen, David Powys and Josh Bentley to the group.

2010: Career beginnings
The band's first demo recordings were done mostly by Sam Bentley at his home and by Rasmussen at his university. At the request of their friends, they put together and released homemade EPs to sell at their shows in Melbourne.

It was not until they recorded and released their single "Bloom" in 2010 that they began attracting media attention. The single and video were released online and gradually grew in popularity. Bentley mentioned, "It was a pretty steady progression of word of mouth, friends telling their friends and so on. It wasn't any sort of viral thing, it was a really natural build up of people sharing our music". Word spread quickly, and live appearances became increasingly well attended. "Bloom" was released by the band, similarly to the first recordings, only available as a hand-made EP with a handful of other tracks. Only about 500 "Bloom" EPs were made by the band. With these home-job EPs, they played several shows in Australia and New Zealand, including their first opening slots for the bands Hungry Kids of Hungary and Passenger.

2011: Woodland
The Paper Kites went on to begin writing and recording what would be their first EP, Woodland. They recorded the EP early in 2011 with Tim Johnston, who was one of Rasmussen's university teachers. Their first official single, "Featherstone", was released in June 2011 in advance of the EP. The new single was again well received by audiences, especially online. Following the single release, the band also released their second video, for "Featherstone". Already having a passion for film, Bentley said, "We always like to get really involved in the videos we make and the people we work with. Our music videos are just further extensions of the song itself, and we always want them to be interesting and engaging. We work pretty closely with our directors." Sam Bentley commented that he felt very lucky for the amount of success "Bloom" and "Featherstone" gained online. That August their EP Woodland was released.

After the release, the band was picked up by booking agent Stephen Wade (founder of Select Music), who was impressed when they sold out The Corner Hotel, an iconic Melbourne venue. Wade introduced the band to managers Gregg Donovan and Stuart MacQueen, who, after seeing the band perform, signed them to Wonderlick Entertainment. Soon after, the band was invited to tour with Josh Pyke on his Only Sparrows national tour in September 2011. In November of that year, The Paper Kites opened on Boy & Bear's 16-date national tour of Moonfire.

In February 2012, the band went on their first headline tour of Australia, playing sold-out shows in small clubs around the country. With the success of Woodland, the band began getting requests for their music on various US television shows, including "Featherstone" being featured in the season 8 finale of Grey's Anatomy.

2012: Young North
In April 2012, the band had over 30 unrecorded demos and were ready to start recording a full-length record. However, they decided to hold off making a full-length album and release a second EP instead, feeling that more touring and building on their sound would be beneficial before releasing their debut record. They decided to work with engineer and producer Wayne Connolly, and recorded the five-track EP through June 2012. It was the band's first time working with a producer. Bentley recalled, "Working with Wayne (Connolly) was very different to how we imagined working with a producer would be. He was very patient while at the same time pushed the best performance out of us. He really got inside the songs and knew how to push our sonic ideas". The title of the EP, Young North, came from the titles of two songs that did not make the cut.

The first single, "A Maker of My Time", was released in July and was quickly picked up by Australian alternative station Triple J. The band also collaborated with Sydney director Jefferton James on the video, capturing a one-take improvised performance from Tendai Dzwairo, just east of the town of Mildura.

With the release of the EP in August 2012, The Paper Kites embarked on a 13-date Young North tour of Australia in October. They found that along with progressing their sound and live performance they were attracting bigger crowds and selling out larger rooms.

Following the tour, the band did a small run of shows opening for UK band Bombay Bicycle Club in January 2013.

2013-2014: States
The Paper Kites began recording their debut full-length album States in February 2013, collaborating once again with producer Wayne Connolly. The album was recorded at Sing Sing Studios in Melbourne, and Alberts Studios in Sydney. The 13-track record was cut down from over 40 un-recorded demos, however the majority of material used was written in a two-week period prior to the band beginning pre-production on the record.

In August/September 2013, the band released the record and toured nationally around Australia on their States tour. In October, they made their first trip to America, opening for Canadian band City and Colour on a 13-date tour across the country. States was released in North America on 1 October, and The Paper Kites continued on their own 17-date headline tour of the US and Canada, marking their first international headline tour selling out a compilation of shows across both countries.

"St Clarity" was the first single released from the record. The music video was directed by acclaimed Australian director Natasha Pincus, starring the French artist Sylvain Letuvée. The second single "Young" was released soon after. The video was directed by Darcy Prendergast, and featured over 4000 portrait photos taken and arranged to make up the video, which was later nominated for a J Award for Australian Music Video of the Year.

2015-2017: twelvefour
The band released their second album twelvefour on 28 August 2015. The album was recorded in Seattle and produced by Grammy-nominated music producer Phil Ek. The sessions took place across two studios—the Avast Recording Company and Chris Walla's studio Hall of Justice. The record is a concept album written entirely between the hours of midnight and four am. The first single, "Electric Indigo", was released in June with a music video following starring actress Laura Brent and Charles Grounds. "Revelator Eyes", "Renegade"  and "Too Late" followed as singles.

Along with the announcement of the album was news of a twelvefour documentary directed by filmmaker Matthew J Cox that followed the band's creation of the album, which has yet to surface. In January 2017 the band released two outtakes from the twelvefour sessions on Spotify.

2018-2020: On the Train Ride Home and On the Corner Where You Live
On 18 April 2018, the band released the first of two new albums, On the Train Ride Home, consisting of eight tracks. The album was recorded in Melbourne at Bellbird Studios with Big Scary/#1 Dads Tom Iansek co producing with singer Sam Bentley. The record was a largely acoustic collection and the release was un-announced. A music video for "On the Train Ride Home" was released directed by Drew Wilson in collaboration with Sam Bentley and the pair worked together on a collection of short videos around the record.

Upon the release of On the Train Ride Home the band announced that it would be the first of an intended double album that they had decided to split in to two separate records. The follow-up album, On the Corner Where You Live, was released on 21 September 2018 and consisted of 11 tracks. The album was recorded at Tarquin Studios in Connecticut with producer Peter Katis working with the band.

The artwork for both On the Train Ride Home and On the Corner Where You Live were painted by Los Angeles noir artist Gina Higgins, who worked with Bentley on the pieces.

The band also announced they would be releasing a special edition double album. It was released on 21 September 2018 and featured a special edition cover painted by Gina Higgins.

The band embarked on their Where You Live tour on 16 July 2018 playing a 93-show tour, with shows in the US, Canada, Europe, Australia and New Zealand. The tour concluded on 15 December 2019 in London.

At the ARIA Music Awards of 2019, On The Corner Where You Live was nominated for Best Adult Contemporary Album.

2021-2022: Roses
In August 2020, the band announced their fifth studio album Roses, a collaborative album of duets. The album features Julia Stone, Lucy Rose, Rosie Carney, Aoife O'Donovan, Nadia Reid, Maro, Amanda Bergman, Ainslie Wills, Lydia Cole and Gena Rose Bruce. The album was released on 12 March 2021.

Musical style
The Paper Kites' sound was originally loosely based around folk music. Sam Bentley's fingerstyle guitar sound is a frequent characteristic, along with Lacy's and his voices together, and the band's harmonies. The progression of this sound, along with the band's many musical inspirations, has pushed them into a range of different genres. When asked about their style of music, Bentley has mentioned, "We are whatever we released on the last record". The band is known for switching instruments live and for their ethereal, moody sound.

Members
 Sam Bentley – lead vocals, guitars, keyboards (2009–present)
 Christina Lacy – guitars, keyboards, backing vocals (2009–present)
 Josh Bentley – drums, percussion (2010–present)
 David Powys – guitars, banjo, lap steel, backing vocals (2010–present)
 Sam Rasmussen – bass guitar, synthesizers (2010–present)

Discography

Studio albums

Extended plays

Singles

Music videos

 Director information adapted from each video description uploaded in the band's official YouTube account.

Awards and nominations

ARIA Awards 
The ARIA Music Awards is an annual awards ceremony that recognises excellence, innovation, and achievement across all genres of Australian music.

|-
|2019
|On The Corner Where You Live
|ARIA Award for Best Adult Contemporary Album
| 
|}

J Awards
The J Awards are an annual series of Australian music awards that were established by the Australian Broadcasting Corporation's youth-focused radio station Triple J. They commenced in 2005.

|-
| 2013
|"Young"
| Australian Video of the Year
|

Notes

References

External links
 
 Interview with The Paper Kites on HonestBlue

2008 establishments in Australia
Australian indie rock groups
Musical groups established in 2008
Nettwerk Music Group artists
Sony Music Australia artists